Douglas de Souza (6 August 1972 – 13 December 1998) was a Brazilian track and field athlete who specialised in the long jump. He represented his country at the 1995 World Championships in Athletics and the 1996 Summer Olympics, competing in the qualifying rounds only.

Born in São Bernardo do Campo, he grew into a tall and muscular athlete at 1.94 m and 88 kg. De Souza was a three-time winner at the Brazilian Athletics Championships, taking wins in 1994, 1996 and 1998. His jumps of  then  were championship record marks.

His life and career were cut short as he died in a car accident at the age of twenty-six in 1998.

International competitions

National titles
Brazilian Athletics Championships
Long jump: 1994, 1996, 1998

References

External links

1972 births
1998 deaths
People from São Bernardo do Campo
Brazilian male long jumpers
Olympic athletes of Brazil
Athletes (track and field) at the 1996 Summer Olympics
World Athletics Championships athletes for Brazil
Road incident deaths in Brazil
Sportspeople from São Paulo (state)
20th-century Brazilian people